Medici, Medicis, The Medicis, or The House of Medici were a prominent medieval Florentine family.

Medici also may refer to:

Other people 
Emilio Medici (1905-1985), former President of Brazil 
Giuseppe Medici (1907–2000), Italian politician and economist
Mita Medici (born 1950), Italian actress and singer

Art, entertainment, and media
Medici (board game), invented by Reiner Knizia
Prix Médicis, a French literary award
Medici (TV series), a television drama about the Medici dynasty
Medici String Quartet, a British classical music ensemble
Medici, a fictional country and setting of the 2015 video game Just Cause 3

Businesses
Bank Medici AG, a former bank based in Vienna, Austria
Medici Bank, a monetary business owned by the eponymous Florentine family

See also
 Medici.tv, an online platform
 
 Medician (disambiguation)